This is an incomplete list of Statutory Instruments of the United Kingdom in 1969.
 The South East Lancashire and North East Cheshire Passenger Transport Area (Designation) Order 1969 S.I. 1969/95
 The Tyneside Passenger Transport Area (Designation) Order 1969 S. I. 1969/96
 The West Midlands Passenger Transport Area (Designation) Order 1969 S. I. 1969/97
 Courts-Martial Appeal Legal Aid (General) Regulations 1969 S.I. 1969/177
 Transfer of Functions (Wales) Order 1969 S.I. 1969/388
 Motor Vehicles (Competitions and Trials) Regulations 1969 S.I. 1969 No. 414
 North Derbyshire Water Board (Charges) Order 1969 S.I. 1969 No. 489
 Camborne Mine (Storage Battery Locomotives) Special Regulations 1969 S.I. 1969/570
 Cotgrave Mine (Suspended Monorail Diesel Locomotives) Special Regulations 1969 S.I. 1969/744
 "Pelican" Pedestrian Crossings Regulations and General Directions 1969 S.I. 1969/888
 Savings Banks (Ordinary Deposits) (Limits) Order 1969 S.I. 1969/939
 Legal Aid (Extension of Proceedings) (Scotland) Regulations 1969 S.I. 1969/955
 Superannuation (Local Government and Approved Employment) Interchange Rules 1969 S.I. 1969/997
 Levant Mine (Storage Battery Locomotives) Special Regulations 1969 S.I. 1969/1236
 Post Office Register (Trustee Savings Banks) (Amendment) Regulations 1969 S.I. 1969/1311
 Trunk Roads (40 m.p.h. Speed Limit) (No.24) Order 1969 S.I. 1969/1480
 County Court Funds (Amendment No. 2) Rules 1969 S.I. 1969/1547
 Plant Varieties and Seeds (Isle of Man) Order 1969 S.I. 1969/1829

External links
Legislation.gov.uk delivered by the UK National Archive
UK SI's on legislation.gov.uk
UK Draft SI's on legislation.gov.uk

See also
List of Statutory Instruments of the United Kingdom

Lists of Statutory Instruments of the United Kingdom
Statutory Instruments